The following lists events that happened during 1875 in Australia.

Incumbents

Governors
Governors of the Australian colonies:
Governor of New South Wales – Hercules Robinson, 1st Baron Rosmead
Governor of Queensland – Sir William Cairns
Governor of South Australia – Sir Anthony Musgrave
Governor of Tasmania – Frederick Weld
Governor of Victoria – Sir George Bowen
Governor of Western Australia – The Hon. Sir Frederick Weld GCMG, then Sir William Robinson GCMG.

Premiers
Premiers of the Australian colonies:
Premier of New South Wales – Henry Parkes until 8 February, then John Robertson
Premier of Queensland – Arthur Macalister
Premier of South Australia – Arthur Blyth until 8 June, then James Boucaut
Premier of Tasmania – Alfred Kennerley
Premier of Victoria – 
 until 7 August – George Kerferd
 7 August - 20 October – Graham Berry
 starting 20 October – James McCulloch

Events
11 January – William Robinson arrives in Western Australia to become Governor of the colony.
13 January – Frederick Weld becomes Governor of Tasmania.
23 January – William Cairns becomes Governor of Queensland.
9 February – John Robertson becomes Premier of New South Wales, replacing Henry Parkes.
24 February –  The SS Gothenburg strikes Old Reef off Ayr, Queensland and sinks with the loss of 102 lives.
24 May – J. V. Mulligan and party discover the Barron River in Queensland, they left Cooktown on 17 April
6 May – Ernest Giles and party leave South Australia for an overland expedition to Perth, they arrive on 10 November.
3 June – Premier of South Australia Arthur Blyth resigns and is replaced by James Boucaut.
7 August – Graham Berry becomes Premier of Victoria.
20 October – James McCulloch becomes Premier of Victoria for the fourth time.
24 December – 59 die when a cyclone destroys the pearling fleet in the Exmouth Gulf of Western Australia.

Arts and literature

New South Government establishes an art gallery in Sydney; it later becomes the Art Gallery of New South Wales.

Sport
 Polo played for the first time in Australia at Albert Park in Victoria
Wollomai wins the Melbourne Cup; the cup was held on the first Tuesday in November for this first time this year

Births
20 March – Benjamin Fuller, theatrical entrepreneur (died 1952)
29 April – Margaret Preston, painter and printmaker (died 1963)
22 July – Leslie James Wrigley, academic, school inspector, principal, and teacher
3 December – Max Meldrum, painter (died 1955)

Deaths
28 January – James Hurtle Fisher, South Australian pioneer (born 1790)
25 February – Thomas Reynolds, premier of South Australia (born 1818)
25 February – James Stokes Millner, medical practitioner (born 1830)
10 September – Silas Gill, Methodist preacher
20 October – Charles Cowper, premier of New South Wales (born 1807)
9 November – William Hovell, explorer (born 1786)
2 December – Charles La Trobe, lieutenant-governor of Victoria (born 1801)

Unknown date

 Henry Willey Reveley, Swan River Colony civil engineer (born 1788)

References

 
Australia
Years of the 19th century in Australia